The 2010 Asian Acrobatic Gymnastics Championships were the seventh edition of the Asian Acrobatic Gymnastics Championships, and were held in Almaty, Kazakhstan from May 25 to May 30, 2010.

Medal summary

Medal table

References

A
Asian Gymnastics Championships
International gymnastics competitions hosted by Kazakhstan
2010 in Kazakhstani sport